Charles Ellis Davies (13 May 1847 – 1 February 1921) was an Australian politician.

He was born in Wellington, New South Wales, the son of John Davies, later co-founder of the Hobart Mercury, and younger brother of John George Davies. In 1897 he was elected to the Tasmanian Legislative Council as the member for Cambridge. He held the seat until his death in Pontville in 1921.

References

1847 births
1921 deaths
Australian people of English-Jewish descent
Independent members of the Parliament of Tasmania
Members of the Tasmanian Legislative Council
19th-century Australian politicians
20th-century Australian politicians